Carabus marietti is a species of ground beetle in the Carabinae subfamily that can be found in Bulgaria, European part of Turkey, and Near East.

Subspecies
Carabus marietti akensis Haury, 1889
Carabus marietti balboi Cavazzuti, 2006
Carabus marietti bischoffi Chaudoir, 1848
Carabus marietti hroni Deuve, 1997
Carabus marietti inexpectatus Basquin & Darge, 1986
Carabus marietti marietti Cristoforis & Jan, 1837
Carabus marietti mouthiezi Lassalle, 1991
Carabus marietti muchei Breuning, 1961
Carabus marietti necopinatus Basquin & Darge, 1986
Carabus marietti ormanensis Blumenthal & Breuning, 1967
Carabus marietti ornatus Heinz, 1976
Carabus marietti sapancaensis Blumenthal & Breuning, 1967
Carabus marietti stefaniruspolii Breuning, 1966

References

marietti
Beetles described in 1837